Walter Planckaert (born 8 April 1948 in Nevele) is a Belgian former professional road racing cyclist. He is the younger brother of Willy Planckaert, the older brother of Eddy Planckaert, and the uncle of Jo Planckaert. He had 74 victories in his professional career. After retiring from riding, he commenced a long career in team management, working for the Panasonic, Novemail–Histor, Palmans, Lotto–Adecco and Chocolade Jacques teams.

Major results

1972
Amstel Gold Race
1973
Kuurne–Brussels–Kuurne
1976
Tour of Flanders
E3 Prijs Vlaanderen
1977
Tour of Belgium
Dwars door Vlaanderen
1978
Tour de France:
Winner stage 1B
1979
Kuurne–Brussels–Kuurne
1984
Dwars door Vlaanderen

References

External links 

Official Tour de France results for Walter Planckaert

Living people
1948 births
Belgian male cyclists
Belgian Tour de France stage winners
Cyclists from East Flanders
People from Nevele